Firgil is a rural locality (a selo) in Tinitsky Selsoviet, Tabasaransky District, Republic of Dagestan, Russia. The population was 396 as of 2010. There are 5 streets.

Geography 
Firgil is located 15 km southeast of Khuchni (the district's administrative centre) by road. Ushnyug is the nearest rural locality.

References 

Rural localities in Tabasaransky District